Sathuran is a 2015 Tamil language action thriller film directed by Rajeev Prasad, a former associate of Suresh Krissna. The film stars Rajaj and Varsha Bollamma in the lead roles.

Plot 
Dheena is a promising auto driver with a good heart and who has a helping tendency. His love, at first sight, starts with Janani (Varsha) and  fights between them starting with searching for a dog puppy, then the diamond earring, then a currency at a parlor and so on, but interestingly in all situations, Dheena has to search them all under the feet of the heroine. He is making many attempts to impress her and have one sided love. All his plans were going in vain.

A family lost their jewels and money arranged for their daughter's marriage, and it was recovered from one of their co-auto drivers Kumar (Kali Venkat)

The movie starts with a gangster and his friend getting murdered by 2 paid goons when they came to shave their heads (a ritual) with all their fellow goons. The killers are getting their next assignment in City to kill 4 (S.I.Ratnam - a Police Inspector, Shiva - an auditor, a stage koothu actor named Theerthagiri and another one). The paid goons who arrived at City got their ride in Dheena's auto to reach their spot to kill the cop (S.I Ratnam). After he left, his friend Kumar arrives at the same spot in a few minutes. Now the goons get Kumar's auto from there to reach the next spot to kill Shiva. 

At the same time Dheena who was giving a ride to Janani and her friends on their way to a bridal makeup. The Cop on patrol stopped Dheena and the girls, then he was sexually harassing and abusing the girls on the road side. On seeing the cop's  behavior, Dheena offended and got struck by the police. But the girls escaped somehow in between these happenings. 

Meanwhile, Kumar realized that there is a bad currency in the money paid by the goons. Kumar went back to the place where he dropped the goons to exchange the money and witnessed the killing of another victim (Shiva) by the same paid goons. 

Kumar escapes from the scene without their notice, but unfortunately, he has to give them a ride again because he was unable to escape the place due to a starting trouble. So he gives the lift to the goons, but on the way, he calls his friend Dheena, who is now in police's custody and informs him about the killing and his current situation. Dheena escapes from the Cop by jumping from the Cop's vehicle to save his friend Kumar. On the way, he calls his other friend to go and save Kumar. Before they both reached there, Kumar was killed.

All CCTV evidence, neighbor's witnesses and the enmity of the investigating Cop from whom Dheena was escaping, makes the Cop decide that Dheena is the murderer. Moreover, in all the murder spots, there is one or other way an auto was involved or the auto's presence was noticed by the neighbors, which makes the cop to strongly believe that Dheena is the accused.

Dheena, who escaped from the Cop, travels to all the spots is witnessing and hearing the conversations on how all the evidence are strongly against him. At the Mortuary, Dheena sees the bodies of S.I.Ratnam and Shiva beside his friend Kumar's body. He somehow realized the link between the 2 bodies and another person Theerthagiri (Koothu actor). Again he is escaping from the Cop. Before he reaches to save Theerthagiri, the goons kill him as well before Dheena enters the back side of the stage. On seeing Dheena, the goons elopes, leaving Theerthagiri. When trying to hold the lying body of Theerthagiri, both police and all audiences witnessed Dheena is the killer.

As usual, Dheena escapes from Cop, and while recollecting the morning event, he realizes that the 4th person who was in the conversation with these 3 who were killed so far is Janani. Though Dheena did not see her face, he recognized it as Janani from the tattoo on the back of her neck. 

Before Cop and the goons get hold of Janani, Dheena meets Janani and informs her about all the 3 deaths and enquires her about her connection with those 3 dead persons.

 
Janani reveals how she was losing her previous job and her connections with those 3 dead persons. When she reveals some facts (a quick flashback on her previous employment) and a name she reveals at the end tells us who is the 4th person the goons are looking for to kill before they plan to kill Janani.

The last 25 minutes of the interesting climax reveals who is the 4th victim. Whether the 4th victim, Janani and Dheena, are saved. Whether Dheena has been proved innocent post his death or living is clearly revealed in the climax of the movie.

Cast 
 Rajaj as Dheena
 Varsha Bollamma as Janani (credited as Varsha Maletira)
 Raju Easwaran as Pasupathy
 Kaali Venkat as Kumar
 Bava Lakshmanan
Krishna
 Devaraj
 Vijay Muthu
 Krishnamoorthy
 Shekar

Production 
Director Prasad worked under Suresh Krissna for the film Baashha (1995). Rajaji, who was last seen in Moodar Koodam, was cast as the director Prasad felt that his look prevented the audience from figuring act the former's next move.  Bangalore-based Varsha Bollamma  was cast as the heroine of the film while  Monikumar G who worked as a cinematographer in Maryan and as an assistant cinematographer in Slumdog Millionaire and Mission: Impossible – Ghost Protocol, was signed as the cinematographer. Much of the film takes place during the night.

Release 
The Times of India gave the film two out of five stars and wrote that "But if only had the execution been better, we would have been treated to a thrilling genre film" while praising the cinematography work and attention getting plot. A critic from Maalai Malar praised the screenplay, cinematography, and music, but criticized the long climax.

References 

Indian action thriller films
2015 action thriller films
2015 films
2010s Tamil-language films